The watt is a unit of power named after Scottish engineer James Watt.

Watt or WATT may also refer to:

People
 Watt (surname), a surname (including a list of people with the name)
 Watt of Sussex, Anglo-Saxon king of Sussex who ruled between about AD 692 and 725
 Watt Hobt (1893–1963), American college football and basketball coach
 Watt Sam (1876–1944), Native American/Natchez storyteller and cultural historian
 Watt W. Webb (1927–2020), American biophysicist
 Watt Key, a pen name of American fiction author Albert Watkins Key, Jr. (born 1970)

Places
 Watt, California, US, a former town in Madera County
 Morne Watt or Watt Mountain, Dominica
 Mount Watt, Victoria Land, Antarctica
 Watt Bay, George V Land, Antarctica
 Watt (crater), a crater on the Moon

Arts and entertainment
 Watt (album), an album by the English blues rock band Ten Years After
 Watt (novel), a book by Samuel Beckett

Other uses
 WATT System, technology for charging electric vehicles
 Watt Library, Greenock, Scotland
 El Tari International Airport (ICAO code: WATT), East Nusa Tenggara, Indonesia
 WATT, an AM radio station in Cadillac, Michigan, US

See also
 Watt balance, the former name of the Kibble balance, an electromechanical device for measuring weight
 Watt & Shand, a former department store in Lancaster, Pennsylvania, US
 WAT (disambiguation)
 WATS (disambiguation)
 Watts (disambiguation)
 What (disambiguation)
 Wot (disambiguation)